ATV: Quad Power Racing 2 is a racing video game developed by Climax Brighton and published by Acclaim Entertainment under their AKA Acclaim label for PlayStation 2, GameCube and Xbox. It's a sequel to ATV: Quad Power Racing. The game is notable for its inclusion of a three-wheeled ATV, not seen in any other video games, and not sold in the real world since the late 1980s.

Gameplay

ATV Quad Power Racing 2 includes overall 20 characters, 10 of which are original for the game and 10 professional ATV racing drivers. All 15 tracks are set over different terrains, like mud, sand or snow. There are multiple playable modes: Career (championship seasons), Arcade (increasingly difficult challenge), Challenge (racing against the top riders), Freestyle (based on scores achieved through aerials) and Time Trial (players race against the clock). During the race, every air jump that lands correctly will retain momentum and speed in an efficient way. The players are also able to kick the opponents off their rides at any time, and doing so steals the stored boost power for use. While there is no online play, the game has several multiplayer modes for two players in split screen: Championship, Freestyle Battle, Single Race, and Head-to-Head.

Reception

The game received "average" reviews on all platforms according to the review aggregation website Metacritic.

Cancelled sequel
At E3 2004, Acclaim Entertainment announced new titles for release, one of them being ATV Quad Power Racing 3 which would be developed by Acclaim Studios Manchester instead of Climax Brighton and would be released in the winter of 2005. The game was later cancelled after Acclaim closed down the Acclaim Studios Manchester and Cheltenham studios due to their financial difficulties and eventual bankruptcy.

With plans for a third ATV Quad Power Racing game scrapped, Climax Studios was eventually approached by Rainbow Studios for another opportunity to develop another ATV racing game, which would be to continue Rainbow Studio's ATV Offroad Fury series, starting with ATV Offroad Fury 3 in 2004, which Rainbow had to abandon after being purchased by THQ to develop MX Unleashed and the MX vs. ATV series. Climax Studios would go on to develop two installments of the Offroad Fury series on PlayStation 2 and port them both to the PlayStation Portable.

References

External links
 

2003 video games
ATV: Quad Power Racing 2
GameCube games
Multiplayer and single-player video games
Off-road racing video games
PlayStation 2 games
Racing video games
Video games developed in the United Kingdom
Xbox games